Curious George is a 1980 television series produced by Alan Shalleck, along with co-creator of Curious George, Margret Rey.

History
In 1977, Alan Shalleck approached Margret Rey, co-creator of Curious George, and proposed making a television series that was funded by Lafferty, Harwood, and Partners. Shalleck and Rey produced more than 100 five-minute episodes, as well as more than two dozen books. The shorts later aired on Nickelodeon in 1986, then on The Disney Channel as a segment of the program Lunch Box in 1989. The shorts were also aired in New Zealand on TV One first as part of Chic Chat and later as a stand alone show.

In 1993, Rey successfully sued Lafferty, Harwood, and Partners for licensing VHS tapes to third-party companies without her permission.

Episodes
Release dates of episodes are unknown, and the following list is ordered by writers.

Crew
 H. A. Rey - Co-creator of Curious George books
 Margret Rey - Co-creator of Curious George books, consultant
 Alan Shalleck - Producer, Director, Writer
 David J. Patterson - Producer
 Jack Duffy - Narrator
 Ken Sobol - Writer
 Tony Kahn - Writer
 Frank Gehrecke - Writer
 Arnie Reisman - Writer
 Linda Beech - Writer
 Daniel Rosen - Writer
 Clare A. Crowley - Writer
 Chris Atkinson - Writer
 Wendy Williams - Writer
 Harriet Reisen - Writer
 Marjorie Prager - Writer
 Gloria Lesser-Rothstein - Writer
 Katherine Randall - Writer
 Bob Hertz - Writer
 Paul Baillargeon - Music
 Dean Morgan - Music
 Diann Ilnicki - Editor
 Mik Casey (as Michael Casey) - Art Director
 Philippe Ralet - Sound Effect Editor
 Lisa Atkinson - Visual Effects Painter

References

External links 
 

Curious George
Animated films based on children's books